This is the Cabinet of Uttarakhand headed by the Chief Minister of Uttarakhand, Vijay Bahuguna from 2012–2014.

Council of Ministers
Here is the list of ministers: 

 Cabinet Ministers
 Indira Hridayesh - (INC)
 Yashpal Arya- (INC)
 Harak Singh Rawat - (INC)
 Surendra Singh Negi - (INC)
 Pritam Singh - (INC)
 Amrita Rawat - (INC)
 Dinesh Agrawal - (INC)
 Mantri Prasad Naithani - (IND)
 Pritam Singh Panwar - (UKD)
 Harish Chandra Durgapal - (IND)
 Surendra Rakesh - (BSP)

References

B
2012 establishments in Uttarakhand
Cabinets established in 2012
Indian National Congress state ministries
Indian National Congress of Uttarakhand
Cabinets disestablished in 2014
2014 disestablishments in India